+02
Architectural Styles 1750-1900